Tetragonoderus unicolor is a species of beetle in the family Carabidae. It was described by Gemminger & Harold in 1868.

References

unicolor
Beetles described in 1868